Glushko is a young impact crater on the Moon attached to the western rim of the crater Olbers.

Glushko possesses a relatively high albedo and is the focus of a prominent ray system that extends in all directions across the nearby surface. It has sharp, well-defined features that, combined with its higher albedo, are indicative of a relatively young impact crater. There is a small outer rampart, and material along the inner walls has slumped to form shelves and ramparts. There are three outward bulges in the rim to the north and northwest.

Due to its prominent rays, Glushko is mapped as part of the Copernican System.

This crater was previously designated Olbers A before being renamed by the IAU.

References

External links
 SMART-1 view of the crater Glushko on the Moon

Impact craters on the Moon